William Crozier (1893 – 1930) was a Scottish landscape painter.

Born in Edinburgh, Crozier studied at Edinburgh College of Art and was a fellow student and friendly with William Geissler, William Gillies, Anne Redpath, Adam Bruce Thomson and William MacTaggart. These artists are all associated with The Edinburgh School.

Assisted by a Carnegie travelling scholarship, together with Geissler and Gillies, Crozier studied under the cubist painter André Lhote in Paris in 1923. In 1924 the three talented young painters pursued their journey to Italy, where Crozier was particularly taken by the bright sunlight and resultant deep shadows, a quality which he later sought to capture in his work. This aspect of his painting and the cubist influences are evident in his 1927 painting,  Edinburgh (from Salisbury Crags). The buildings are represented as simple geometric blocks with intense contrast between the sunlit facades and heavily shaded sides.

Crozier suffered from haemophilia and was affected by ill health for most of his life. He died aged only 37 after a fall in his studio. An exhibition of his work was given at the Scottish National Gallery of Modern Art in Edinburgh in 1995

External links
 William Crozier at the National Gallery of Scotland
 William Crozier (1893-1930) Publication of the National Galleries of Scotland for the Exhibition at the Scottish National Gallery of Modern Art, Edinburgh. 11 May - 9 July 1995. By Ann Simpson. Pale Green Press.

References 

1893 births
1930 deaths
Scottish landscape painters
Cubist artists
Alumni of the Edinburgh College of Art
Artists from Edinburgh
Scottish watercolourists
20th-century Scottish painters
Scottish male painters
20th-century Scottish male artists